Philip Lane may refer to:

Sir Philip Lane (police officer) (c. 1870–1927), Chief Constable of Lancashire, 1912–1927
Phil Lane (footballer) (1911–2006), Australian rules footballer
Philip Lane (composer) (born 1950), British composer and musicologist
Philip R. Lane (born 1969), Irish economist, fourth Chief Economist of the European Central Bank and former Governor of the Central Bank of Ireland
Phil Lane (ice hockey) (born 1992), American ice hockey player